Koffikro-Afféma is a village in south-eastern Ivory Coast. It is in the sub-prefecture of Maféré, Aboisso Department, Sud-Comoé Region, Comoé District. The border with Ghana is six kilometres northeast of the village.

Koffikro-Afféma was a commune until March 2012, when it became one of 1126 communes nationwide that were abolished.

Notes

Former communes of Ivory Coast
Populated places in Comoé District
Populated places in Sud-Comoé